Future Shock is a 1972 American short documentary film directed by Alex Grasshoff and narrated by Orson Welles. It was screened at the 1973 Cannes Film Festival, but wasn't entered into the main competition. It is based on the 1970 book of the same name by Alvin Toffler.

See also
 List of American films of 1972
 Orson Welles filmography

References

External links

1972 films
1972 documentary films
American documentary films
1970s English-language films
Documentary films about technology
Films directed by Alex Grasshoff
Films based on non-fiction books
1970s American films